Alice Schofield or Alice Schofield Coates (3 May 1881 – 19 June 1975) was a British suffragette and politician. She campaigned for women to have the vote and later campaigned for the legislation to give women rights to equal pay.

Life
Schofield was born in Cleveland, but her family was poor and she was brought up by an uncle and aunt in Manchester. She was not religious and she was a vegetarian. She trained as a teacher with Teresa Billington who was also not religious. Schofield met Emmeline Pankhurst at a disciplinary hearing after Schofield refused to teach about religion. Other accounts say that she met Pankhurst at a speech. However Pankhurst was a member of the Manchester Education committee and she arranged for Schofield to start work at a Jewish school where religious instruction was not legally required.

She and Teresa Billington joined the Independent Labour Party and both went to join Pankhurst's Women's Social and Political Union. She met Eva Gore-Booth and Esther Roper and she was enthusiastic about women's suffrage but not about the WSPU. Like many members she was alarmed by the autocratic manner of Emmeline and Christabel Pankhurst.

In 1907 the breakaway group of the Women's Freedom League was formed with more of a democratic approach. The new league included Charlotte Despard, Teresa Billington and Schofield. Schofield was employed as a full time official. The league was also militant, but it objected to the extreme measures encouraged by the Pankhursts WSPU which included arson. In 1909 she was based in Middlesbrough where a brother of another WFL member came to her rescue. He was Charles Coates and they married in February 1910. Coates had a good income from importing coal and they employed servants who taught and looked after their three children. Schofield was thus able to trave on speaking tours to South Shields or into Scotland on WFL business and she made frequent trips to London to attend WGL meetings where she was on the executive committee. She used the name Alice Schofield Coates. Coates and her husband operated a vegetarian restaurant on Linthorpe Road, Middlesbrough.

In 1919 Schofield stood as the first woman councillor in Middlesbrough. In 1924 her husband's business ceased to be profitable. Schofield continued to support the Labour Party and she became a Justice of the Peace.

At the end of her career she campaigned for women to have the right to equal pay. The legislation was passed in 1970. Schofield died in 1975.

References

1881 births
1975 deaths
British suffragists
British vegetarianism activists
People from Redcar and Cleveland